Marcia Theophilo (born 1941 in Fortaleza) is a Brazilian poet. She studied in Rio de Janeiro, São Paulo and Rome, where she graduated in anthropology. She has lived and worked in Rome since 1971. She is a bilingual poet; her books can be found in Portuguese, Italian and English.

Marcia Theophilo has published short stories, essays, and eleven books of poetry. These books include I bambini giaguaro/Os meninos jaguar, which won the Fregene Prize, Kupahuba Albero dello Spirito Santo, and Amazonia Respiro Del Mondo. The Amazon rainforest is the topic of Marcia's life and work: its river, people, myths, the animal and plant life, and the effort and persistence to save The Amazon's natural and cultural heritage.

External links 
 http://www.theophilo-amazonia-e-poesia.info/
 http://www.wuz.it/archivio/cafeletterario.it/interviste/theophilo_marcia.html

1941 births
Living people
20th-century Brazilian poets
20th-century Brazilian women writers
21st-century Brazilian poets
21st-century Brazilian women writers
Brazilian women poets